The Domain Name System of the Internet consists of a set of top-level domains that constitute the root domain of the hierarchical name space and database. In the growth of the Internet, it became desirable to expand the initial set of six generic top-level domains in 1984. As a result, new top-level domain names have been proposed for implementation by ICANN. Such proposals included a variety of models ranging from adoption of policies for unrestricted gTLDs that could be registered by anyone for any purpose, to chartered gTLDs for specialized uses by specialized organizations. In October 2000, ICANN published a list of proposals for top-level domain strings it had received.

Geographic proposals
 

  – Generic geographical locations.

People who purchase novelty deeds for outer space property from him are also given free domains. None of these TLDs are supported at present by root servers.
  – was proposed by City of Toronto officials.

Internationalized country code top-level domains

The following ccTLDs (country code top-level domains) have been requested using a procedure known as Internationalized Domain Name (or IDN) ccTLD Fast Track Process.

The following countries have national languages that use other scripts than Latin, but have no internationalized country code top-level domain, and none proposed in the above list:
Afghanistan
Bhutan
Cambodia
Cyprus
Eritrea
Ethiopia
North Korea
Kyrgyzstan
Lebanon
Maldives
Myanmar
Nepal
Tajikistan

Language and community
These proposals are centered on creating an independent Internet identity for linguistic and cultural communities. They are mostly inspired by the success of the  domain created for websites in the Catalan language or about the Catalan culture.

 Note: The dotCYMRU, dotEUS, dotSCOT and dotBZH have formed the ECLID, the European Cultural and Linguistic Internet Domains umbrella group to lobby for the successful and speedy application for the bids.

Technical domain name themes
  – A domain for e-mail networks, proposed to facilitate fighting e-mail spam.
  – A domain for general use on the World Wide Web.

Specialized and professional topics
  – environmental causes – Limited existence in 2016 and full launch in 2017.
  – medical practitioners and organizations – exists from 2016.
  – electronic commerce sites – exists from 2016.
  – sport sites

See also
 List of Internet top-level domains
 Generic top-level domain – New top-level domains

References